Washington Adrián de la Cruz (born 26 May 1964 in Montevideo, Uruguay) is a retired Salvadoran–Uruguayan footballer.

Club career
Nicknamed Adriancillo, de la Cruz played for the Peñarol youth team in his native Uruguay. He joined Salvadoran side Alianza in 1985 and had three spells with them, winning several league titles.
In between these three periods he also played for second division sides Atlético Balboa and Arsenal as well as for Atlético Marte.

International career
De la Cruz made his debut for El Salvador in a January 1998 friendly match against Honduras and has earned a total of 4 caps, scoring no goals. He has represented his country at the 1998 CONCACAF Gold Cup.

His final international game was a February 1998 CONCACAF Gold Cup match against Jamaica.

Honours

References

External links

1964 births
Living people
Footballers from Montevideo
Salvadoran people of Uruguayan descent
Naturalized citizens of El Salvador
Association football defenders
Uruguayan footballers
Salvadoran footballers
El Salvador international footballers
1998 CONCACAF Gold Cup players
Alianza F.C. footballers
Atlético Balboa footballers
C.D. Atlético Marte footballers